Hafniomonas is a genus of green algae in the family Dunaliellaceae.

References

External links

Chlamydomonadales genera
Chlamydomonadales